Fog Bound is a 1923 American silent drama film directed by Irvin Willat and written by Jack Bechdolt and Paul Dickey. The film stars Dorothy Dalton, David Powell, Martha Mansfield, Maurice Costello, Jack Richardson, Ella Miller, and Willard Cooley. The film was released on May 27, 1923, by Paramount Pictures.

Cast
Dorothy Dalton as Gale Brenon
David Powell as Roger Wainright
Martha Mansfield as Mildred Van Buren
Maurice Costello as Deputy Brown
Jack Richardson as Sheriff Holmes
Ella Miller as Mammy
Willard Cooley as Deputy Kane
William David as Gordon Phillips
Warren Cook as Revenue Officer Brenon

References

External links

1923 films
1920s English-language films
Silent American drama films
1923 drama films
Paramount Pictures films
Films directed by Irvin Willat
American black-and-white films
American silent feature films
1920s American films